Depressaria multifidae is a moth in the family Depressariidae. It was described by John Frederick Gates Clarke in 1933. It is found in North America, where it has been recorded from Oregon, Washington, Idaho and California.

The wingspan is 17–21 mm.

The larvae feed on Lomatium columbianum, Lomatium grayi and Pteryxia terebinthina.

References

Moths described in 1933
Depressaria
Moths of North America